Ukrainian Greeks are a Greek minority that reside in or used to reside in the territory of modern Ukraine. The majority of Ukrainian Greeks live in Donetsk Oblast and are particularly concentrated around the city of Mariupol.

According to the 2001 Ukrainian Census, there were 91,548 ethnic Greeks in Ukraine, or 0.2% of the population. However, the actual percentage of those with Greek ancestry is likely to be much higher due to widespread intermarriage between ethnic Greeks and those Ukrainian citizens who are Ukrainian Orthodox, particularly in eastern Ukraine, as well as the absence of strong links to Greece or use of the Greek language by many with Greek ancestry in these areas and who therefore are not classified as Greeks in official censuses.

Most Greeks in Ukraine belong to the larger Greek diaspora known as Pontic Greeks. But there are also a small recent group of Greek expats and immigrants to Ukraine.

History

A Greek presence throughout the Black Sea area existed long before the beginnings of Kyivan Rus'. For most of their history in this area, the history of the Greeks in Russia and in Ukraine forms a single narrative, of which a division according to present-day boundaries would be an artificial anachronism. Most present-day Greeks in Ukraine are the descendants of Pontic Greeks from the Pontus region between the fall of the Empire of Trebizond in 1461 and the Russo-Turkish War of 1828–1829.

Ancient Greek colonies (6th century BCE–1st century BCE) 
Greeks established colonies on what are now the Ukrainian shores of the Black Sea as early as the 6th century BCE. These colonies traded with various ancient nations around the Black Sea, including Scythians, Maeotae, Cimmerians, Goths and predecessors of the Slavs. These earlier Greek communities had, however, assimilated into the wider, indigenous population of the region.

Greek-speaking kingdoms in Crimea (4th century BC–15th century AD) 
The Greek colonies coalesced into the Bosporan Kingdom in the 4th century BCE, which lasted as a Roman client state until the 4th century AD. Additionally, the Kingdom of Pontus was founded in the 3rd century BC and controlled territory in Ukraine (including the Bosporan Kingdom) until its acquisition by the Roman Empire in the 1st century AD.

After the 13th century Cuman and Mongol-Tatar Golden Horde invasion of the steppes of southern Ukraine and Russia to the north, Greeks had remained only in the towns on the southern slopes of the Crimean Mountains and became divided into two sub-groups: Tatar-speaking Urums and Rumaiic Pontic Greeks with Rumeíka Greek as their mother tongue.

The Crimean Principality of Theodoro gained independence from the Empire of Trebizond in the early 14th century and lasted until its conquest by the Ottoman Empire in the 15th century.

Russian conquest (18th century) 
The Urums and Rumaiic Pontic Greeks lived among the Crimean Tatars until the Russian Empire conquered the Crimea in 1783. Then Catherine the Great decided to relocate the Pontic Greeks from Crimea to the northern shores of the Sea of Azov. New territory was assigned for them between today's cities of Mariupol and Donetsk, covering the southern portion of the Donetsk Oblast in Ukraine. Ukrainians and Germans, and afterwards Russians, were settled among the Greeks. The Ukrainians mostly settled villages and some towns in this area, unlike the Greeks, who rebuilt their towns, even giving them their original Crimean names. Since this time in Ukraine the names of settlements in the Crimea match names of places in the south of the Donetsk Oblast: Yalta-Yalta, Hurzuf-Urzuf, etc.

The Filiki Eteria, a Greek freemasonry-style society which was to play an important role in the Greek war of independence, was founded in Odesa in 1814 before relocating to Constantinople in 1818. 

During 1937–1938, the Pontic Greeks endured another deportation by the Soviet authorities known as the Greek Operation of the NKVD.

Ottoman Empire refugees (15th century–19th century) 

The Greeks of present-day Ukraine are mainly the descendants of various waves of especially Pontic Greek refugees and "economic migrants" who left the region of Pontus and the Pontic Alps in northeastern Anatolia between the fall of the Empire of Trebizond in 1461 and the Russo-Turkish War of 1828–1829, although some had settled in Ukraine in the late-19th or early-20th centuries.

Greek Civil War refugees (1946–1949) 
Other Greeks arrived in Ukraine even later, particularly, as Greek Communist refugees from mainly Greek Macedonia and other parts of Northern Greece, who had fled their homes following the 1946–1949 Greek Civil War and settled in the USSR, Czechoslovakia and other Eastern Bloc states. However, even among these late arrivals, there were many communist Greek refugees who settled in Ukraine following the Greek Civil War who were in fact Pontic Greeks or Caucasus Greeks and therefore often had ancestors who had lived within the southern territories of the Russian Empire before settling in Greece in the early 20th century.

By the 2001 census 91,500 Greeks remained, the vast majority of whom (77,000) still lived in the Donetsk Oblast. Higher estimates such as 160,000 were reported previously, the fall being explained by assimilation forced by the Soviet government. Other small populations of Greeks are in Odesa and other major cities.

Russo-Ukrainian War (2014-present) 

In the prelude to the 2022 Russian invasion of Ukraine, the Greek foreign ministry released a statement claiming that three soldiers of the Ukrainian Army "murdered" two diaspora Greeks and injured two others in the village of Granitna in Eastern Ukraine over "a trivial matter". Following the 2022 Russian invasion of Ukraine, ten diaspora Greeks were killed by Russian airstrikes near the city of Mariupol. In the village of Sartana, outside Mariupol, two diaspora Greeks were killed by Russian airstrikes. The Russian diplomatic mission in Athens published material, according to which during the Siege of Mariupol, Greek expatriates from Mariupol claimed that Ukrainian soldiers were trying to prevent them from leaving the besieged city, which was published by  One Greek expatriate was reported by AFP to have perished in eastern Ukraine, in which Greece had blamed it on Ukrainian soldiers. Following the Mariupol hospital airstrike, the Prime Minister Kyriakos Mitsotakis of the Hellenic Republic tweeted on 18 March 2022 that "Greece is ready to rebuild the maternity hospital in Mariupol, the center of the Greek minority in Ukraine, a city dear to our hearts and symbol of the barbarity of the war".

Distribution

Raions of Donetsk Oblast with significant Greek minority:

See also 
 Greece–Ukraine relations
 Mariupol#Language structure
 Pontic Greeks, Greek diaspora
 Greeks in Russia
 Greeks in Georgia

References

  Coins of Olbia: Essay of Monetary Circulation of the North-western Black Sea Region in Antique Epoch. Киев, 1988. .
Coinage and Monetary Circulation in Olbia (6th  century B.C. – 4th century A.D.) Odesa (2003). .
 The City of Tyras. A Historical and Archaeological Essay. Одеса: Polis-Press, 1994)..   

Ukraine
Ethnic groups in Ukraine
Indigenous peoples of Ukraine